Active listening is the practice of preparing to listen, observing what verbal and non-verbal messages are being sent, and then providing appropriate feedback for the sake of showing attentiveness to the message being presented. This form of listening conveys a mutual understanding between speaker and listener. Speakers receive confirmation their point is coming across and listeners absorb more content and understanding by being consciously engaged. The overall goal of active listening is to eliminate any misunderstandings and establish clear communication of thoughts and ideas between the speaker and listener. It may also be referred to as Reflective Listening. Active listening was introduced by Carl Rogers and Richard Farson, in 1957.

History 
Carl Rogers and Richard Farson coined the term "active listening" in 1957 in a paper of the same title (reprinted in 1987 in the volume Communicating in Business Today). Practicing active listening also emphasized Rogers' (1980) concept of three facilitative conditions for effective counseling; empathy, genuineness, and unconditional positive regard. Rogers and Farson write: "Active listening is an important way to bring about changes in people. Despite the popular notion that listening is a passive approach, clinical and research evidence clearly shows that sensitive listening is a most effective agent for individual personality change and group development. Listening brings about changes in peoples' attitudes toward themselves and others; it also brings about changes in their basic values and personal philosophy. People who have been listened to in this new and special way become more emotionally mature, more open to their experiences, less defensive, more democratic, and less authoritarian."

Technique
Active listening comprises several components by the listener, who must pay attention to what the speaker is attempting to communicate and elicit clarification where necessary for comprehension. "Many studies suggest that even the smallest improvements in a person’s listening ability can have a noticeable impact on the overall effectiveness of communication and productivity." By developing this skill of active listening, it can positively impact the speaker and the listeners' understanding and relationship.

From the speakers’ perspective, listening is a multidimensional construct that includes attention, comprehension, and positive intention.

Comprehension

The first step in the active listening process is that of comprehension. Comprehension is a shared meaning between parties in communication. This can be done through top-down or bottom-up listening strategies. Top-down listening for comprehension will involve preparing for what message is likely going to be given, attempting to organize what is being communicated, and listening for summarizations or shifts in topic. Bottom-up listening for comprehension will involve an attentiveness to emphasized words such as longer or louder words. In addition, careful attention should be paid to repeated parts of the message being communicated. Attentiveness can be emphasized not just in one's ability to listen, but to listen and respond with sensitivity to particular needs or cultural norms. For example, if you are listening to someone communicate through a disability such as severe lower-functioning autism, you will need to pay close attention and forego common methods of organizing information as it is received. In many of today's cultures, comprehension may include a knowledge of people using neutral pronouns or preferred pronouns. In order to listen for comprehension, it will be important for a receiver to be aware and understand these cultural norms.

Retaining
Retaining is the second step in the process. Memory is essential to the active listening process because the information retained when a person is involved in the listening process is how meaning is extracted from words. Because everyone has different memories, the speaker and the listener may attach different meanings to the same statement. Memories are fallible. Poor memory retaining techniques like cramming may cause information to be forgotten as our brains have a limited capacity to process more than one thing at a time. This may be due to the fact that your brain needs more time to effectively process and retain the information given in order to successfully store it into a more solidified form of memory. Retaining information from messages being received is increased with the amount of attentiveness the receiver gives to what is being communicated. For example, information is best retained in adults if the adult has experience in what is being said, communicates back and forth with another communicator about the topic, and maintains visual contact with the source of the message being sent.

Responding
There are three basic steps for responding in the following order:

 Paraphrase: Explain what you believe has been said in your own words.
 Clarify: Ensure you understand what has been said through asking questions.
 Summarize: Offer a concise overview of what you believe the main points and intent of the message received are.

Here are the guidelines to help fine tune one's ability to follow these steps:

 Keep your attention on the message being presented
 Refrain from thinking about your own response to what is being presented.
 Refrain from offering judgement on anything the other person says.
 Observe non-verbal content. These are their own kind of communication which can be clarified by the active listener.

Barriers to active listening
There are a multitude of factors that may impede upon someone's ability to listen with purpose and intention; these factors are referred to as listening blocks.  Some examples of these blocks include rehearsing, filtering, and advising. Rehearsing is when the listener is more focused on preparing their response rather than listening. Filtering is when a listener focuses only on what they expect to hear, while tuning out other aspects of what is being said, and lastly, advising is when the listener focuses on problem solving, which can create a sense of pressure to fix what the other person is doing wrong. There are three types of barriers to effective listening: Environmental, Physiological, and Psychological.

Environmental Barriers 
Environmental barriers are brought about by the speakers environment. Some examples include noises, smells, bad cell reception, and any other factors that make it difficult to hear and process information. Sometimes it is due to the language the speaker uses—such as high sounding and bombastic words that can lead to ambiguity. Other barriers include distractions, trigger words, vocabulary, and limited attention span. Environmental barriers likely can not be eliminated but they can be managed.

Physiological Barriers 
Physiological barriers are those that are brought about by the listener's body. They can be temporary or permanent. Hearing loss and deficiencies are usually permanent boundaries. Temporary physiological barriers include headaches, earaches, hunger or fatigue of the listener. Another physiological boundary is the difference between the slow rate of most speech and the brain's ability to process that information. Typically, the brain can process around 500 words per minute while the average rate of speech for speakers is 125 words per minute. This difference make it easy for the mind to wander.

Psychological Barriers 
Psychological barriers interfere with one's willingness and mental capacity for listening. Pre-existing biases can lead to listening to someone else's argument for its weaknesses, ignoring its strengths. This can lead to a competitive advantage in a political debate, or by a journalist to provoke a strong response from an interviewee, and is known as "ambushing". Individuals in conflict often blindly contradict each other. On the other hand, if one finds that the other party understands, an atmosphere of cooperation can be created.

Shift response
"Shift response is the general tendency of a speaker in a conversation to affix attention to their position." This is a type of conversational narcissism—the tendency of listeners to turn the topic to themselves without showing sustained interest in others. A support response is the opposite of a shift response; it is an attention giving method and a cooperative effort to focus the conversational attention on the other person. Instead of being me-oriented like shift response, it is we-oriented. It is the response a competent communicator is most likely to use.

Overcoming listening barriers
The active listening technique is used to improve personal communications in organizations.  Listeners put aside their own emotions and ask questions and paraphrase what the speaker says to clarify and gain a better understanding of what the speaker intended to say. Distractions that interrupt the listener's attention are one of the major barriers to effective listening. These include external factors such as background noise and physical discomfort, and internal distractions, such as thoughts about other things and lack of focus, as well as the use and presence of technology. Another barrier is misinterpretation of what the speaker is attempting to communicate, including assumption of motives, and "reading between the lines", as is premature judgment of the speaker's point, which can occur as a consequence of the listener holding onto a rigid personal opinion on the topic. This problem can be mitigated by asking the speaker what they mean when it is unclear, though this is not guaranteed to work every time.

A strong disagreement hinders the ability to listen closely to what is being said. Eye contact and appropriate body languages are seen as important components to active listening, as they provide feedback to the speaker. The stress and intonation used by the speaker may also provide information to the listener, which is not available in the written word.

Applications
Active listening is used in a wide variety of situations, including public interest advocacy, community organizing, tutoring, medical workers talking to patients, HIV counseling, helping suicidal persons, management, 
counseling, and journalistic settings. In groups it may aid in reaching consensus. It may also be used in casual conversation or small talk to build understanding. Active listening plays a large role in the success of a leader. Leaders need to build trust and respect with those around them and mastering the skills of active listening will help them greatly.

A listener can use several degrees of active listening, each resulting in a different quality of communication. These degrees include repeating to indicate attentiveness, paraphrasing to signify understanding, and reflecting to acknowledge perspective and application.

The proper use of active listening results in getting people to open up, avoiding misunderstandings, resolving conflict, and building trust. In a medical context, benefits may include increased patient satisfaction, improved cross-cultural communication, improved outcomes, or decreased litigation.

Active listening in music
Active listening has been developed as a concept in music and technology by François Pachet, researcher at Sony Computer Science Laboratory, Paris. Active listening in music refers to the idea that listeners can be given some degree of control on the music they listen to, by means of technological applications mainly based on artificial intelligence and information theory techniques, by opposition to traditional listening, in which the musical media is played passively by some neutral device

Criticism
A Munich-based marital therapy study conducted by Dr. Kurt Hahlweg and associates found that even after employing active listening techniques in the context of couple's therapy, the typical couple was still distressed.

Active listening was criticized by John Gottman's The Seven Principles for Making Marriage Work as being of limited usefulness: 

Robert F. Scuka defends active listening by arguing that:

See also

References

Further reading
 Arnold, Kyle (24 October 2014). "Behind the Mirror: Reflective Listening and Its Tain in the Work of Carl Rogers". The Humanistic Psychologist. 42:4, 354–69. .
 Zenger, Jack, and Folkman, Joseph (14 July 2016). "What Great Listeners Actually Do". Listening Skills. Harvard Business Review.

External links
 Listening is powerful medicine, Weekend Edition Sunday, National Public Radio February 2009
 Active Listening International Online Training Program On Intractable Conflict: Conflict Research Consortium, University of Colorado
 Empathic listening skills How to listen so others feel heard, or listening first aid (University of California). Download a one-hour seminar on empathic listening and attending skills.
 Exercise 4 – Active Listening, Center for Rural Studies, University of Vermont, Montpelier
 Active listening: A communication tool

Counseling
Psychotherapy
Relationship counseling